Kerala Council of Ministers, are elected legislative members, who are appointed as ministers by the Kerala State Governor to form the executive branch of the Government of Kerala. They hold various portfolios as decided by the Chief Minister of Kerala. 

The Kerala Council of Ministers is headed by the Chief Minister and oversees the work of all ministers. The structure of the Kerala State Government is determined by the Constitution of India (1950)..

The Kerala Council of Ministers along with the other elected legislative members assemble at the Kerala Legislative Assembly to introduce new drafts of law (otherwise known as bills), discuss them with other elected members of the assembly, revise the drafts for edits if necessary. A bill once finalised is sent to vote on the floor of the house of Kerala Legislative Assembly and if the bill receives the majority vote, it becomes a binding law else it is rejected and the existing law continues. The members of the Legislative Assembly together also makes the Council of Ministers and the Chief Minister accountable on behalf of the people, for any misuse of executive powers vested with them.

The Kerala Council of Ministers is accountable to periodically evaluate the existing law of the land and ensures they are in the best interest of the society at large, which they represent under a democratic system. Kerala State Governor is also regarded as a member of the Legislative Assembly and may suspend or dissolve when no coalition is able to muster a working majority).

Present Council of Ministers

The incumbent chief minister of Kerala is serving his second consecutive term, and was sworn into power on 20 May 2021. The oath-taking ceremony was held at the Central Stadium. The Kerala Governor administered the oath of office and secrecy to the new members.

Chronological Order of Kerala Government Ministries

See also
 List of Chief Ministers of Kerala
 List of MPs from Kerala

References

Further reading

External links
 Kerala Government (Official Website)

Government of Kerala
State council of ministers of India